The Black Duck River is a short river in St. Mary's Bay, on the Avalon Peninsula, Newfoundland and Labrador, Canada. It flows from its source through the Black Duck Ponds to its mouth at the Rocky River, near the community of Colinet, just upstream of that river's mouth at St. Mary's Bay on the Atlantic Ocean.

References

Rivers of Newfoundland and Labrador